St. David is a village in Fulton County, Illinois, United States. The population was 589 at the 2010 census.

Geography
St. David is located in eastern Fulton County at  (40.491796, -90.051958). Illinois Route 100 runs along the southeast edge of the village, leading southwest  to Lewistown, the county seat.

Demographics

As of the census of 2000, there were 587 people, 239 households, and 163 families residing in the village. The population density was 1,982.1 people per square mile(755.5/km). The racial makeup of the village was 99.83% White and 0.17% African American.

There were 239 households, out of which 28.0% had children under the age of 18 living with them, 54.8% were married couples living together, 9.6% had a female householder with no husband present, and 31.4% were non-families. 25.1% of all households were made up of individuals, and 18.0% had someone living alone who was 65 years of age or older.  The average household size was 2.46 and the average family size was 2.95.

In the village, the population was spread out, with 24.5% under the age of 18, 7.3% from 18 to 24, 27.1% from 25 to 44, 22.0% from 45 to 64, and 19.1% who were 65 years of age or older.  The median age was 38 years. For every 100 females, there were 107.4 males.  For every 100 females age 18 and over, there were 96.9 males.

The median income for a household in the village was $30,625, and the median income for a family was $37,188. Males had a median income of $34,792 versus $18,250 for females. The per capita income for the village was $14,292.  About 8.2% of families and 11.1% of the population were below the poverty line, including 12.8% of those under age 18 and 5.8% of those age 65 or over.

Local attractions 
The village had one bank (Farmers State Bank of Fulton County) which closed and the brick bank building was taken over by the local water authority (Dunfermine-St. David Water), one gas-station/pizzeria/convenience store (Casey's General Store), two taverns (Betty's Rite Bank Saloon and Phillips Station Tavern), the St. David Optimist Club, and two churches (St. Michaels Catholic Church, and a Nazarene church). The Methodist church disbanded and the church building sold as a private residence. The St. David U.S. Post Office branch is located on Main Street across from the Casey's General Store.

There are two parks. The Village Park located on Main Street contains a ball diamond (named in honor of John Perardi), playground area and the Village Memorial Board. 40 Acres Park is located on the western side of town and contains a ball diamond and memorial for Rodney Yurkovich, who spent much of his life coaching baseball teams that played on this diamond. It is also the location of the Village Hall.

Government 
St. David is the home to the Buckheart Township government offices and garage. The township supervisor is Frank Shubert.

The village government consists of a board of trustees, Village President (Mayor), Village Clerk, treasurer, Ordinance and Zoning Officer, attorney. The village had a contract with the Fulton County Sheriff to patrol and enforce the laws.
 Village President: Rosella Wells
 Village Clerk: Jason Myetich
 Village Board of Trustees: Michael Keithley, Steve Nebergall, David Vaughn, Terry Davis, Cheryle Mathis, Robert Crotzer
 Village Treasurer: Julie Russell
 Village Attorney: Andrewe Johnson
 Village Ordinance & Zoning Officer: Gary Lightle
 Village Street Supervisor: Bill Kumer

References

Villages in Fulton County, Illinois
Villages in Illinois